Trou Moet Blycken is a historical chamber of rhetoric over 500 years old and currently a gentlemen's club located in the middle of a busy shopping area on the Grote Houtstraat in Haarlem, Netherlands.

History

Though the society probably goes back earlier in time, the earliest document from the archives shows that it definitely was mentioned by name in 1503, so this has been historically used as the year of establishment, most recently for the 500 year anniversary in 2003. This was not the only chamber of rhetoric in Haarlem; The Haarlem painters Job Adriaenszoon Berckheyde and Salomon de Bray were members of the chamber called 'De Wijngaardranken'. Most notable is the lottery and rhetoric contest that the club hosted in 1609 which involved several chambers of rhetoric who brought their "blazoen" (blason) with them as a gift, and these are still on display in the meeting hall. The club leaders commissioned a written version of the various acts held at the 1609 international contest that was written by Zacharias Heyns and published in 1607.

The front of the building is decorated with pelicans, symbolizing the blazoen of the chamber itself, a pelican feeding its young.

References

External links

Rijksmonuments in Haarlem
History of Haarlem
Chamber of rhetoric
Dutch artist groups and collectives